Mark Graham (born 24 October 1974) is a Northern Irish footballer who played in The Football League for Cambridge United and Queens Park Rangers.

References

Association footballers from Northern Ireland
English Football League players
1974 births
Living people
Queens Park Rangers F.C. players
Cambridge United F.C. players
Stevenage F.C. players
Aldershot Town F.C. players
Billericay Town F.C. players
Canvey Island F.C. players
St Albans City F.C. players
Association football midfielders